Fort Selkirk Vent is a geological name for a cinder cone in central Yukon, Canada, located just east of Fort Selkirk along the Yukon River.

Fort Selkirk Vent and the surrounding landscape lies in the Fort Selkirk Volcanic Field of the Northern Cordilleran Volcanic Province. During the Pleistocene period, eruptions of basaltic lava occurred. One of these several eruptions created Fort Selkirk Vent and no eruptions have originated from Fort Selkirk Vent since the Pleistocene period.

See also
List of volcanoes in Canada
List of Northern Cordilleran volcanoes
Volcanism of Canada
Volcanism of Western Canada

References

Volcanoes of Yukon
Northern Cordilleran Volcanic Province
Pleistocene volcanoes